Scouting in South Carolina has a long history, from the 1910s to the present day, serving thousands of youth in programs that suit the environment in which they live.

Early history (1910-1950)
In 1914, the BSA gave local councils the power to ban African Americans from Scouting. Until 1974, some southern councils of the Boy Scouts of America were still racially segregated. For example, the Old Hickory Council in North Carolina did not integrate until 1974.

Scouting in South Carolina today

There are six Boy Scouts of America (BSA) local councils in South Carolina.

Blue Ridge Council
Headquarters located in Greenville, SC
Foothills District
Long Cane District
Oconee District
Pickens District
Reedy Falls District
Saluda River District
Scoutreach Division
Six and Twenty District
Southbounder District

Coastal Carolina Council
Black River District
Etiwan District
Palmetto District (merger of Kiawah and Lowcountry District)
Pineland District
Swamp Fox District
Twin Rivers District

Georgia Carolina Council

Council office located in Augusta, Georgia, includes districts in South Carolina and Georgia.

Indian Waters Council
Scouting programs in Bamberg, Calhoun, Fairfield, Kershaw, Lexington, Orangeburg, Richland and Saluda Counties of South Carolina

Capital Rivers
Chinquapin
Edisto
Etowah
Wateree

ScoutReach

Muscogee Lodge 221

Palmetto Council
Pinckney District - Spartanburg County School Districts 1 & 2 and all of Cherokee County.
L & C District - All of Lancaster County and All of Chester County.
Middle Tyger District - Spartanburg County School Districts 4, 5 & 6.
Piedmont District - Spartanburg County School Districts 3 & 7 and all of Union County.
York District - All of York County.*

Home of the Skyuka lodge

Pee Dee Area Council

The Pee Dee Area Council  covers 11 counties in northeastern South Carolina.

Girl Scouting in South Carolina

There are four Girl Scout councils in South Carolina.

Girl Scouts of South Carolina - Mountains to Midlands 
This council was formed on May 1, 2007, from the merger of Girl Scout Council of the Congaree Area, Girl Scouts of the Old 96 Council, and Girl Scouts of the Piedmont Area Council, and serves 15,000 girls and adult volunteers in 22 counties  Its headquarters are located in Greenville, SC.

Camps:
Camp Mary Elizabeth - an Urban camp,  within the city of Spartanburg, SC.
Camp WaBak - Marietta, South Carolina -  in the mountains
Camp Wistagoman - Anderson, SC - 
Camp Ponderosa -  in Pauline, South Carolina.

Girl Scouts of Eastern South Carolina 

Girl Scouts of Eastern South Carolina (GSESC) began operations in January 2007 following the merger of Girl Scout Council of the Pee Dee Area, Inc. and Girl Scouts of Carolina Low Country. The council serves over 15,000 girls and 3,000 adults in Allendale, Bamberg, Barnwell, Beaufort, Berkeley, Calhoun, Charleston, Chesterfield, Clarendon, Colleton, Darlington, Dillon, Dorchester, Florence, Georgetown, Horry, Lee, Marion, Marlboro, Orangeburg and Williamsburg counties..  Its service centers are located in Florence, South Carolina and North Charleston, South Carolina. Its headquarters are also in North Charleston, SC.

Camps:
Sandy Ridge - Bennettsville, SC -

Girl Scouts of Historic Georgia 

This council serves more than 13,000 girls and 5,000 adults in Georgia, Alabama, and South Carolina. Its headquarters are in Lizella, Georgia. In South Carolina, it serves the counties of Hampton and Jasper. It does not have any camps in South Carolina. 

See also: Scouting in Georgia.

Girl Scouts, Hornet's Nest Council

The Girl Scouts, Hornets' Nest Council is headquartered in Charlotte, North Carolina. It was chartered in 1935. It serves 19,000 girls in North Carolina and South Carolina. In South Carolina, it serves the county of York. It does not have any camps in South Carolina. 

See also: Scouting in North Carolina.

See also

References

External links
Blue Ridge Council, BSA
Coastal Carolina Council, BSA
Georgia Carolina Council, BSA
Indian Waters Council, BSA
Palmetto Council, BSA
Pee Dee Area Council, BSA
Girl Scouts of Eastern South Carolina

Youth organizations based in South Carolina
South Carolina
Southern Region (Boy Scouts of America)